Tulihe is a town under the administration of Yakeshi City in far northeastern Inner Mongolia, China, located  northeast of Yakeshi and  south-southeast of Genhe. , it has two residential communities under its administration.

Climate
Lows average below freezing for nine calendar months and the 24-hour average temperature is below freezing for seven calendar months. Winters are long, severely cold, and very dry in terms of total precipitation, while summers are short and warm. A majority of the annual precipitation occurs in July and August alone. With monthly percent possible sunshine ranging from 45% in July to 71% in February and March, the town receives 2,497 hours of bright sunshine annually.

See also
List of township-level divisions of Inner Mongolia

References

Township-level divisions of Inner Mongolia